CWH may refer to:

 CWH is the ICAO airline designator for Canadian Warplane Heritage Museum, Canada
 CWH is the Amtrak station code for Cornwells Heights station in Pennsylvania, United States
 CWH is the United Kingdom National Rail Station Code for Crews Hill railway station
 the Centre for Workplace Health, United Kingdom
 the Central Washington Hospital, United States
 Canada's Worst Handyman (TV series) - CWH1 season 1, CWH2 season 2, CWH3 season 3
Coarse woody habitat